List of presidents of the National Assembly of Madagascar.

Below is a list of presidents of the Constituent and Legislative Assembly:

Below is a list of presidents of the National Assembly:

Below is a list of co-presidents of the transitional Committee for Economic and Social Recovery:

Below is a list of presidents of the National Assembly of Madagascar:

See also
National Assembly (Madagascar)

References

Politics of Madagascar
Madagascar, National Assembly